Devaalayam is a 1964 Indian Malayalam-language film, directed N. S. Muthukumaran and Ramanathan. The film was produced by Manneth David. The film stars Prem Nazir, Adoor Bhasi, Thikkurissy Sukumaran Nair and Kedamangalam Sadanandan. The film had musical score by V. Dakshinamoorthy.

Cast
 
Prem Nazir 
Adoor Bhasi 
Thikkurissy Sukumaran Nair 
Kedamangalam Sadanandan 
T. R. Omana 
T. S. Muthaiah 
Ambika 
J. A. R. Anand 
Kottarakkara Sreedharan Nair 
Mavelikkara Ponnamma 
Padmini 
S. P. Pillai 
Santha Devi

Soundtrack
The music was composed by V. Dakshinamoorthy and the lyrics were written by Abhayadev.

References

External links
 

1964 films
1960s Malayalam-language films
Films directed by S. Ramanathan